Christopher Blunt may refer to:

 Christopher Blount (1555/56–1601), English soldier, secret agent, and rebel
 Christopher Evelyn Blunt (1904–1987), British merchant banker and numismatist